Khoj is a 1971 Indian Hindi-language film directed by Jugal Kishore, starring Farida Jalal, Shatrughan Sinha, Jayshree T. and Deepak Kumar in lead roles.

Cast

Deepak Kumar as Vinod
Farida Jalal as Aasha
Shatrughan Sinha as Amar
K. N. Singh as Gangster
Jayshree T. as Deepa
Mehmood Junior as Raju 
Leela Mishra as Vinod Mother 
Hira Lal as Gangster
Brahmachari as Giridhar Gopal
Rajan Kapoor as Inspector

Music
"Ram Kare More Saiyya Ho Aise, Jaise Raadha Ke Shyam" - Suman Kalyanpur, Parveen Sultana
"Halka Halka Sa Rang Gulaabi Sa, Tera Chehra Lag Rha Hai" - Kishore Kumar, Mohammed Rafi
"Maine Tujhse Kiya Hai Pyar, O Meri Mehbooba Ye Dil Tujhko Hi Dunga" - Mohammed Rafi
"Jiske Pyar Ke Aage Is Duniya Ka Sar Jhuk Jaata Hai" - Usha Khanna, Suman Kalyanpur
"Yeh Tanhaai Yeh Jazbaat, Aur Tum Mere Sath" - Suman Kalyanpur, Usha Khanna
"Ruk Jaa Ae Albeli Jara Ruk Jaa, Ye JethKi Chanchal Dhoop Hai" - Kishore Kumar

References

External links
 

1971 films
Films scored by Usha Khanna
1970s Hindi-language films
1971 drama films